Shchyolkovo is a rural locality (a village) in Staroselskoye Rural Settlement, Mezhdurechensky District, Vologda Oblast, Russia. The population was 31 as of 2002.

Geography 
Shchyolkovo is located 25 km southwest of Shuyskoye (the district's administrative centre) by road. Svyatogorye is the nearest rural locality.

References 

Rural localities in Mezhdurechensky District, Vologda Oblast